William - The Detective is a book in the Just William series written by Richmal Crompton. Modern editions contain ten stories; it originally contained eleven: In a (for the series) rare example of moral panic, the eleventh, entitled "William and the Nasties" has been  removed from reprints of the book since 1986 because, though ultimately anti-Nazi, it was considered inappropriate after the atrocities of the Holocaust, especially for a book aimed at children. William and the League of Perfect Love has also been removed from some editions under pressure from the animal-rights activists it satirises..

The stories

William and the Campers
William the Invisible – William swears he can discover the secret of invisibility, but finds the task more difficult than he had expected.
William the Conspirator – The Outlaws start a campaign for Free Speech.
William the Rat Lover – William starts a sanctuary for the protection of rats and even has a Rat Fortnight. But when his costume for Miss Chesterfield's Children's Animal Fete is ruined, they help him without knowing it.
William and the Tablet
William and the League of Perfect Love
Waste Paper Wanted – William and Ginger believe they have accidentally given away an important manuscript belonging to Robert's intellectual friend Ward.
William the Persian
William and the Monster
A Present from William
Removed story: William and the Nasties – William and his friends attempt (unsuccessfully) to imitate Nazi stormtroopers by driving a Jewish shopkeeper from his business. ("Nasties" is William's mispronunciation of "Nazis".)

1935 short story collections
Short story collections by Richmal Crompton
Children's short story collections
Just William
1935 children's books
George Newnes Ltd books